Xenopoulo is a small village and a community in the island of Kefalonia, Greece. Its population in 2011 was 50 for the village, and 108 for the community, which includes the villages Andriolata (pop. 8) and Kapandriti (pop. 50). Xenopoulo is situated at the eastern slope of Mount Ainos, at about 320 m elevation. It is 3 km northwest of Agia Eirini, 5 km west of Poros and 21 km east of Argostoli. Xenopoulo was devastated by the 1953 Ionian earthquake.

Population

See also

List of settlements in Cephalonia

External links
Xenopoulo at the GTP Travel Pages

References

Populated places in Cephalonia
Eleios-Pronnoi